The Century Center Convention Center, designed by architects Philip Johnson and John Burgee, broke construction in 1974 and opened in 1977, has been managed by SMG since July, 2013. The center, built on the banks of the West Race canal, overlooks the St. Joseph River in downtown South Bend, Indiana, United States.

Century Center includes a  Convention Hall that can be split into two smaller halls. This level also offers a  Discovery Ballroom that can be separated into two equal halls.

Century Center Convention Center's  Great Hall is includes a  glass wall which overlooks the St. Joseph River.  Eighteen meeting rooms, with over 35 combinations, complement the overall space. A pre-function area is located on the lower level adjacent to the Great Hall.  A two-story high glass wall encompasses the Great Hall, with a view of the St. Joseph River.

The Century Center Convention Center provides access via an enclosed, climate-controlled skywalk to a 300-room DoubleTree hotel. It houses the South Bend Museum of Art and is connected by a tunnel to the former College Football Hall of Fame.

Features
75,000 square feet of function space, including:
 Great Hall- 16,600 sq/ft
 36,500 sq/ft of column free convention halls
 Eighteen suites- 17,600sq/ft
 Bendix Theatre- 694 fixed seats
 Recital Hall- 166 fixed seats
 Pre-Function and Registration area
 Wired for high-speed WiFi Internet access
 Media services
 In-house food and beverage, including kosher preparation area
 350 space parking lot adjacent to Century Center
 Loading docks with two bays; overhead doors with the ability to drive indoors into Convention Halls
 Connected to a 300-room full service DoubleTree Hotel
 An additional 175 rooms located within two blocks of Century Center
 Over 4,000 hotel rooms within the cities of South Bend and Mishawaka
 On average, 650 events per year
 Over 250,000 visitors per year

Events
The Century Center Convention Center hosts events throughout the year, from consumer shows to conventions to corporate meetings to weddings.  Some of the more notable open-to-public annual events include:
 Michiana Home Show
 Michiana Boat and Outdoor Show
 Valley RV & Camping Show

References

External links
SMG official website

Buildings and structures in South Bend, Indiana
Convention centers in Indiana
Tourist attractions in South Bend, Indiana